The Sixshooter Peaks are two iconic sandstone summits located in Bears Ears National Monument in San Juan County, Utah, United States. They are situated 1.5 mile outside the boundary of the park, and four miles northwest of Bridger Jack Butte. Variant names for the peaks include "North Six-Shooter Peak", "South Six-shooter Peak", "Six Shooter Peaks", and "Six-shooter Peak". They are so named because of their resemblance to a pair of revolvers pointing skyward.

Geology
Sixshooter Peaks are composed of hard, fine-grained Wingate Sandstone, which is the remains of wind-borne sand dunes deposited approximately 200 million years ago in the Late Triassic. This Wingate sandstone forms steep cliffs as it overlays softer layers of the Chinle Formation which formed conical mounds beneath the Wingate towers. The layer below this is Moenkopi Formation. In the early 1980s, land surrounding South Sixshooter Peak was considered for the nation's first high-level nuclear waste repository, because thick salt beds 3,000 feet below the surface were potential host rocks for storing radioactive materials.  Precipitation runoff drains into nearby Indian Creek, which is part of the Colorado River drainage basin.

Climbing
The first ascent of North Sixshooter Peak was made April 14, 1962, by Maurice Horn, Huntley Ingalls, and Steve Komito via Southwest Chimney. South Sixshooter Peak was first climbed in September 1969 by Billy Roos, Burnham Arndt, and Denver Collins. The popular south peak is a good climb for beginners and has one of the easiest tower routes in the Indian Creek climbing area.

North Sixshooter Peak climbing routes
 Talk Dusty To Me 
 Southeast Chimney Route class 5.10 A1
 Liquid Sky class 5.11+
 Shadows Route class 5.10
 Gunsmoke class 5.11+
 Lightning Bolt Cracks class 5.11-
 Perfect Hands All the Way class 5.11+
 Pratt's Crack class 5.10

South Sixshooter Peak climbing routes
 South Face routes class 5.6 to 5.11

Climate
Spring and fall are the most favorable seasons to visit the Sixshooter Peaks. According to the Köppen climate classification system, they are located in a Cold semi-arid climate zone, which is defined by the coldest month having an average mean temperature below , and at least 50% of the total annual precipitation being received during the spring and summer.

Gallery

See also

 Geology of the Canyonlands area
 Colorado Plateau

References

External links

 Weather Forecast: North Sixshooter Peak
 North Six Shooter Peak Rock Climbing: Mountainproject.com
 South Sixshooter Rock Climbing: Mountainproject.com
 Climbing Lightning Bolt Cracks, North Six Shooter: YouTube
 Climbing South Sixshooter: Vimeo

Landforms of San Juan County, Utah
Sandstone formations of the United States
Colorado Plateau
Bears Ears National Monument
Buttes of Utah
Rock formations of Utah
North American 1000 m summits